Kuchinda (Sl. No.: 15) is a Vidhan Sabha constituency of Sambalpur district.
Area of this constituency includes Kuchinda, Kuchinda block, Bamra block and Jamankira block.

Elected Members

13 elections held during 1967 to 2019. List of members elected from this constituency are:

2019: (15): Kishore Chandra Naik (BJD)
2014: (15): Rabinarayan Naik (BJP)
2009: (15): Rajendra Kumar Chhatria (Congress)
2004: (132): Rabinarayan Naik (BJP)
2000: (132): Rabinarayan Naik (BJP)
1995: (132): Panu Chandra Nayak (Congress)
1990: (132): Brundaban Majhi (Janata Dal)
1985: (132): Jagateshwara Mirddha (Congress)
1980: (132): Jagateshwara Mirddha (Congress-I)
1977: (132): Jagateshwara Mirddha (Congress)
1974: (132): Jagateshwara Mirddha (Congress)
1971: (118): Jagateshwara Mirddha (Orissa Jana Congress)
1967: (118): Kahnei Singh (Swatantra Party)

2019 Election Result
In 2019 election, Biju Janata Dal candidate Kishore Chandra Naik defeated  Bharatiya Janata Party  candidate Rabi Narayan Naik by a margin of 3,508 votes.

2014 Election Result
In 2014 election, Bharatiya Janata Party candidate Rabinarayan Naik defeated Biju Janata Dal candidate Bhubaneswar Kisan by a margin of 22,064 votes.

2009 Election Result
In 2009 election Indian National Congress candidate Rajendra Kumar Chhatria, defeated Bharatiya Janata Party candidate Rabinarayan Naik by a margin of 12,712 votes.

Notes

References

Sambalpur district
Assembly constituencies of Odisha